MCAS may refer to:

 Maneuvering Characteristics Augmentation System, a flight control subsystem on the Boeing 737 MAX airplane designed to enhance pitch stability
 Marine Corps Air Station, a designation of multiple  installations of the United States Marine Corps
 Massachusetts Comprehensive Assessment System, a standards-based education assessment in the American state of Massachusetts
 Mast cell activation syndrome, a disorder or immunological condition
 Matrícula Consular or Matricula Consular de Alta Seguridad, an identification card issued by the Government of Mexico
 Microsoft Cloud App Security, a cloud security product by Adallom
 Multnomah Community Ability Scale, a standardized mental health assessment
 Michigan City Area Schools a school district in Michigan City, Indiana

See also
 MCA (disambiguation)